Cara Black and Sania Mirza were the defending champions, but lost in the final to Andrea Hlaváčková and Peng Shuai, 4–6, 4–6.

Seeds

Draw

Finals

Top half

Bottom half

References
 Main Draw

Open Womens Doubles